Coalinga High School is a public high school in Coalinga, California. It lies southwest of Fresno, California and northeast of San Luis Obispo, California.  It serves both the communities of Coalinga and Huron. It is a member of the West Sierra League Conference.  Its mascot is the Horned Toad.

Academics
Coalinga offers a variety of classes including several CTE courses as well as AP and Pre-AP courses.  Coalinga High School also works closely with the local community college, West Hills College, and provides dual enrollment for participating students who wish to enroll in college courses while in high school. Some of our elective classes consist of ASB, Drama, Art, Ceramics, Web Page Design, Multi-media, Band, Choir, etc.

Pre-AP & AP Courses 
 Pre-AP English 9
 Pre-AP English 10
 AP English Language & Composition 11
 AP English Literature & Composition 12
 AP World History
 AP US History
 AP Government
 AP Calculus AB
 AP Biology
 AP Spanish Language & Culture

Enrollment
Coalinga High School has had an enrollment of about 1,158 students in 2017-2018 school year.  Coalinga High School is very integrated in the school years of 2011-2012 with, 0.1% American Indian/Alaska Native 0.2% Native Hawaiian/Pacific Islander, 2.2% Asian, 79.9% Hispanic, 1.4% Black, and 16.0% White.

Student Body Clubs 
There are numerous clubs available to students at Coalinga High School. A few of most notable are the following:
 California Scholarship Federation (CSF)
 Fellowship of Christian Athletes (FCA) 
 Future Farmers of America (FFA)

Athletics
Currently, Coalinga High School offers its students 12 sports teams: baseball, softball, basketball, swimming, football, wrestling, volleyball,  track and field, soccer, cross country, tennis, and cheerleading.

References

External links

Coalinga High School website
Coalinga-Huron Joint Unified School District
CHUSD - Engage, Challenge, and Inspire
Aerial Tour of the Campus

Public high schools in California
Educational institutions established in 1909
High schools in Fresno County, California
1909 establishments in California